Niue is an island country in the South Pacific Ocean,  northeast of New Zealand. Niue is located in a triangle between Tonga, Samoa, and the Cook Islands. It is 604 kilometres northeast of Tonga. The island is commonly referred to as "The Rock", which comes from the traditional name "Rock of Polynesia". Niue is one of the world's largest coral islands. The terrain of the island has two noticeable levels. The higher level is made up of a limestone cliff running along the coast, with a plateau in the centre of the island reaching approximately 60 metres (200 feet) above sea level. The lower level is a coastal terrace approximately 0.5 km (0.3 miles) wide and about 25–27 metres (80–90 feet) high, which slopes down and meets the sea in small cliffs. A coral reef surrounds the island, with the only major break in the reef being in the central western coast, close to the capital, Alofi.

Niue is a self-governing state in free association with New Zealand, and New Zealand conducts most diplomatic relations on its behalf. As part of the Realm of New Zealand, Niueans are citizens of New Zealand and Charles III is Niue's head of state in his capacity as King of New Zealand. Between 90% and 95% of Niuean people live in New Zealand, along with about 70% of the speakers of the Niuean language. Niue is a bilingual country, with 30% of the population speaking both Niuean and English. The percentage of monolingual English-speaking people is only 11%, while 46% are monolingual Niuean speakers.

Niue is not a member of the United Nations (UN), but UN organisations have accepted its status as a freely associated state as equivalent to independence for the purposes of international law. As such, Niue is a member of some UN specialised agencies (such as UNESCO and the WHO), and is invited, alongside the other non-UN member state, the Cook Islands, to attend United Nations conferences open to "all states". Niue has been a member of the Pacific Community since 1980.

Niue is subdivided into 14 villages (municipalities). Each village has a council that elects its chairperson. The villages are at the same time electoral districts; each village sends an assemblyperson to the Niue Assembly (parliament). A small and democratic nation, Niueans hold legislative elections every three years.

History

Polynesians from Samoa settled Niue around 900 AD. Further settlers arrived from Tonga in the 16th century.

Until the beginning of the 18th century, Niue appears to have had no national government or national leader; chiefs and heads of families exercised authority over segments of the population. A succession of patu-iki (kings) ruled, beginning with Puni-mata. Tui-toga, who reigned from 1875 to 1887, was the first Christian king.

The first Europeans to sight Niue sailed under Captain James Cook in 1774. Cook made three attempts to land, but the inhabitants refused to grant permission to do so. He named the island "Savage Island" because, as legend has it, the natives who "greeted" him were painted in what appeared to be blood. The substance on their teeth was hulahula, a native red fe'i banana. For the next couple of centuries, Niue was known as Savage Island until its original name, "Niue", which translates as "behold the coconut", regained use.

Whaling vessels were some of the most regular visitors to the island in the nineteenth century. The first on record was the Fanny in February 1824. The last known whaler to visit was the Albatross in November 1899.

The next notable European visitors represented the London Missionary Society; they arrived on the Messenger of Peace. After many years of trying to land a European missionary, they abducted a Niuean named Nukai Peniamina and trained him as a pastor at the Malua Theological College in Samoa. Peniamina returned in 1846 on the John Williams as a missionary with the help of Toimata Fakafitifonua. He was finally allowed to land in Uluvehi Mutalau after a number of attempts in other villages had failed. The chiefs of Mutalau village allowed him to land and assigned over 60 warriors to protect him day and night at the fort in Fupiu.

In July 1849 Captain John Erskine visited the island in HMS Havannah.

Christianity was first taught to the Mutalau people before it spread to all the villages. Originally other major villages opposed the introduction of Christianity and had sought to kill Peniamina. The people from the village of Hakupu, although the last village to receive Christianity, came and asked for a "word of God"; hence, their village was renamed "Ha Kupu Atua" meaning "any word of God", or "Hakupu" for short.

In 1889 the chiefs and rulers of Niue, in a letter to Queen Victoria, asked her "to stretch out towards us your mighty hand, that Niue may hide herself in it and be safe". After expressing anxiety lest some other nation should take possession of the island, the letter continued: "We leave it with you to do as seems best to you. If you send the flag of Britain that is well; or if you send a Commissioner to reside among us, that will be well". The British did not initially take up the offer. In 1900 a petition by the Cook Islanders asking for annexation included Niue "if possible". In a document dated 19 October 1900, the "King" and Chiefs of Niue consented to "Queen Victoria taking possession of this island". A despatch to the Secretary of State for the Colonies from the Governor of New Zealand referred to the views expressed by the Chiefs in favour of "annexation" and to this document as "the deed of cession". A British Protectorate was declared, but it remained short-lived. Niue was brought within the boundaries of New Zealand on 11 June 1901 by the same Order and Proclamation as the Cook Islands. The Order limited the islands to which it related by reference to an area in the Pacific described by co-ordinates, and Niue, at 19.02 S., 169.55 W, lies within that area.

The New Zealand Parliament restored self-government in Niue with the 1974 constitution, following a referendum in 1974 in which Niueans had three options: independence, self-government or continuation as a New Zealand territory. The majority selected self-government, and Niue's written constitution
was promulgated as supreme law. Robert Rex, ethnically part European, part native, was elected by the Niue Assembly as the first premier, a position he held until his death 18 years later. Rex became the first Niuean to receive a knighthood – in 1984.

In January 2004 Cyclone Heta hit Niue, killing two people and causing extensive damage to the entire island, including wiping out most of the south of the capital, Alofi.

On March 7, 2020, the International Dark Sky Association announced that Niue had become the first Dark Sky Preserve Nation. On 29 September 2022, President Joe Biden announced that the United States would recognize Niue as a sovereign nation.

Government and politics

The Niue Constitution Act of 1974 vests executive authority in His Majesty the King in Right of New Zealand and in the Governor-General of New Zealand. The Constitution specifies that everyday practice involves the exercise of sovereignty by Cabinet, composed of the Premier (currently Dalton Tagelagi since 11 June 2020) and of three other ministers. The Premier and ministers are members of the Niue Assembly, the nation's parliament.

The Assembly consists of 20 members, 14 of them elected by the electors of each village constituency, and six by all registered voters in all constituencies. Electors must be New Zealand citizens, resident for at least three months, and candidates must be electors and resident for 12 months. Everyone born in Niue must register on the electoral roll.

Niue has no political parties; all Assembly members are independents. The only Niuean political party to have ever existed, the Niue People's Party (1987–2003), won once (in 2002) before disbanding the following year.

The Legislative Assembly elects a Speaker as its first official in the first sitting of the Assembly following an election. The speaker calls for nominations for premier; the candidate with the most votes from the 20 members is elected. The premier selects three other members to form a Cabinet, the executive arm of government. General elections take place every three years, most recently on 30 May 2020.

The judiciary, independent of the executive and the legislature, includes a High Court and a Court of Appeal, with appeals to the Judicial Committee of the Privy Council in London.

Defence and foreign affairs

Niue has operated as a self-governing state in free association with New Zealand since 3 September 1974, when the people endorsed the Constitution in a plebiscite. Niue is fully responsible for its internal affairs. Niue's position concerning its external relations is less clear-cut. Section 6 of the Niue Constitution Act provides that: "Nothing in this Act or in the Constitution shall affect the responsibilities of Her Majesty the Queen in right of New Zealand for the external affairs and defence of Niue." Section 8 elaborates but still leaves the position unclear: Effect shall be given to the provisions of sections 6 and 7 [concerning external affairs and defence and economic and administrative assistance respectively] of this Act, and to any other aspect of the relationship between New Zealand and Niue which may from time to time call for positive co-operation between New Zealand and Niue after consultation between the Prime Minister of New Zealand and the Premier of Niue, and in accordance with the policies of their respective Governments; and, if it appears desirable that any provision be made in the law of Niue to carry out these policies, that provision may be made in the manner prescribed in the Constitution, but not otherwise."

Niue has a representative mission (High Commission) in Wellington, New Zealand.

Initially, Niue's foreign relations and defence were the responsibility of New Zealand. However, Niue gradually began to develop its own foreign relations, independent of New Zealand.  It is a member of the Pacific Islands Forum and of a number of regional and international agencies. It is not a member of the United Nations, but is a state party to the United Nations Convention on the Law of the Sea, the United Nations Framework Convention on Climate Change, the Ottawa Treaty and the Treaty of Rarotonga. The country became a member state of UNESCO on 26 October 1993. It established diplomatic relations with the People's Republic of China on 12 December 2007. The joint communique signed by Niue and China differs in its treatment of the Taiwan question from that agreed by New Zealand and China. New Zealand "acknowledged" China's position on Taiwan but has never expressly agreed with it, but Niue "recognises that there is only one China in the world, the Government of the People's Republic of China is the sole legal government representing the whole of China and Taiwan is an inalienable part of the territory of China." Niue established diplomatic relations with India on 30 August 2012. On 10 June 2014 the Government of Niue announced that Niue had established diplomatic relations with Turkey. The Honourable Minister of Infrastructure Dalton Tagelagi formalised the agreement at the Pacific Small Island States Foreign Ministers meeting in Istanbul, Turkey.

People of Niue have fought as part of the New Zealand military. During World War I (1914-1918), Niue sent about 200 soldiers as part of the New Zealand (Māori) Pioneer Battalion in the New Zealand forces.

Niue is not a republic, but for a number of years the ISO list of country names (ISO 3166-1) listed its full name as "the Republic of Niue". In its newsletter of 14 July 2011, the ISO acknowledged that this was a mistake and the words "the Republic of" were deleted from the ISO list of country names.

Niue has no regular indigenous military forces; defence is the responsibility of New Zealand.

Geography

Niue is a  raised coral atoll in the southern Pacific Ocean, east of Tonga. There are three outlying coral reefs within the Exclusive Economic Zone, with no land area:

Niue is one of the world's largest coral islands. A coral reef surrounds the island, with the only major break in the reef being in the central western coast, close to the capital, Alofi. A number of limestone caves occur near the coast.

The island is roughly oval in shape (with a diameter of about ), with two large bays indenting the western coast, Alofi Bay in the centre and Avatele Bay in the south. Between these is the promontory of Halagigie Point. A small peninsula, TePā Point (Blowhole Point), is close to the settlement of Avatele in the southwest. Most of the population resides close to the west coast, around the capital, and in the northwest.

Some of the soils are geochemically very unusual. They are extremely weathered tropical soils, with high levels of iron and aluminium oxides (oxisol) and mercury, and they contain high levels of natural radioactivity. There is almost no uranium, but the radionucleides Th-230 and Pa-231 head the decay chains. This is the same distribution of elements as found naturally on very deep seabeds, but the geochemical evidence suggests that the origin of these elements is extreme weathering of coral and brief sea submergence 120,000 years ago. Endothermal upwelling, by which mild volcanic heat draws deep seawater up through the porous coral, almost certainly contributes.

No adverse health effects from the radioactivity or the other trace elements have been demonstrated, and calculations show that the level of radioactivity is probably much too low to be detected in the population. These unusual soils are very rich in phosphate, but it is not accessible to plants, being in the very insoluble form of iron phosphate, or crandallite. It is thought that similar radioactive soils may exist on Lifou and Mare near New Caledonia, and Rennell in the Solomon Islands, but no other locations are known.

According to the World Health Organization, residents are evidently very susceptible to skin cancer. In 2002 Niue reported skin cancer deaths at a rate of 2,482 per 100,000 people – far higher than any other country.

Niue is separated from New Zealand by the International Date Line. The time difference is 23 hours during the Southern Hemisphere winter and 24 hours when New Zealand uses Daylight Saving Time.

Climate
The island has a tropical rainforest climate (Af) according to the Köppen climate classification with high temperatures and rainfall throughout the year. Although there are no true wet or dry seasons, there is a noticeably wetter stretch from October to May.

Environment
A leader in green growth, Niue is also focusing on solar power provision, with help from the European Union. However, Niue currently deals with one of the highest rates of greenhouse gas production per capita in the world. This must be considered however in the context of the small population, and the installed generating capacity of between 833 kW to 1MW. Niue aims to become 80% renewable by 2025. The Niue Island Organic Farmers Association is currently paving way to a Multilateral Environmental Agreement (MEA) committed to making Niue the world's first fully organic nation by 2020.

In July 2009 a solar panel system was installed, injecting about 50 kW into the Niue national power grid. This is nominally 6% of the average 833 kW electricity production. The solar panels are at Niue High School (20 kW), Niue Power Corporation office, (1.7 kW) and the Niue Foou Hospital (30 kW). The EU-funded grid-connected photovoltaic systems are supplied under the REP-5 programme and were installed recently by the Niue Power Corporation on the roofs of the high school and the power station office and on ground-mounted support structures in front of the hospital. They will be monitored and maintained by the NPC. In 2014 two additional solar power installations were added to the Niue national power grid, one funded under PALM5 of Japan is located outside of the Tuila power station – so far only this has battery storage, the other under European Union funding is located opposite the Niue International Airport Terminal.

Flora and fauna

Niue is part of the Tongan tropical moist forests terrestrial ecoregion. The island is home to approximately 60 native or pre-European plants, and approximately 160 naturalised flowering plant species. Compared to other Polynesian islands, Niue has sparse documentation for what plants were traditionally found on the island (almost no records are found between the documentation by James Cook's crew in 1774, and Truman G. Yuncker's botanical survey of the island in 1940).

The Huvalu Forest Conservation Area is a 5,400 ha site on the eastern side of the island. It was established in 1992 and protects the largest area of primary forest in Niue. It has been designated an Important Bird Area (IBA) by BirdLife International because it supports populations of crimson-crowned fruit doves, blue-crowned lorikeets, Polynesian trillers and Polynesian starlings.

Economy

Niue's gross domestic product (GDP) was NZ$17 million in 2003, or US$10 million at purchasing power parity. Its GDP had increased to US$24.9 million by 2016. Niue uses the New Zealand dollar.

The Niue Integrated Strategic Plan (NISP) is the national development plan, setting national priorities for development. Cyclone Heta set the island back about two years from its planned timeline to implement the NISP, since national efforts concentrated on recovery efforts. In 2008, Niue had yet to fully recover. After Heta, the government made a major commitment to rehabilitate and develop the private sector. In 2004 the New Zealand government allocated $1 million for the private sector, and spent it on helping businesses devastated by the cyclone, and on construction of the Fonuakula Industrial Park. This industrial park is now completed and some businesses are already operating from there. The Fonuakula Industrial Park is managed by the Niue Chamber of Commerce, a not-for-profit organisation providing advisory services to businesses.

Joint ventures

The government and the Reef Group from New Zealand started two joint ventures in 2003 and 2004 to develop fisheries and a 120-hectare noni juice operation. Noni fruit comes from Morinda citrifolia, a small tree with edible fruit. Niue Fish Processors Ltd (NFP) is a joint venture company processing fresh fish, mainly tuna (yellowfin, big eye and albacore), for export to overseas markets. NFP operates out of a state-of-the-art fish plant in Amanau Alofi South, completed and opened in October 2004.

Trade

Niue is negotiating free trade agreements with other Pacific countries, PICTA Trade in Services (PICTA TIS), Economic Partnership Agreements with the European Union, and PACERPlus with Australia and New Zealand. The Office of the Chief Trade Adviser (OCTA) has been set up to assist Niue and other Pacific countries in the negotiation of the PACERPlus.

Mining

In August 2005, an Australian mining company, Yamarna Goldfields, suggested that Niue might have the world's largest deposit of uranium. By early September these hopes were seen as overoptimistic, and in late October the company cancelled its plans, announcing that exploratory drilling had identified nothing of commercial value. The Australian Securities and Investments Commission filed charges in January 2007 against two directors of the company, now called Mining Projects Group Ltd, alleging that their conduct had been deceptive and that they engaged in insider trading. This case was settled out of court in July 2008, both sides withdrawing their claims.

Revenue
Remittances from expatriates were a major source of foreign exchange in the 1970s and early 1980s. Continuous migration to New Zealand has shifted most members of nuclear and extended families there, removing the need to send remittances back home. In the late 1990s, PFTAC conducted studies on the balance of payments, which confirmed that Niueans are receiving few remittances but are sending more money overseas.

Foreign aid

Foreign aid is a significant source of income, accounting for approximately a third of Niue's annual government revenue. Most aid comes from New Zealand, which has a legal obligation to provide economic and administrative assistance. Other sources of revenue for the government are taxation and trading activities, such as philatelic services and the lease of phone lines.

Offshore banking

The government briefly considered offshore banking. Under pressure from the US Treasury, Niue agreed to end its support for schemes designed to minimise tax in countries like New Zealand. Niue provides automated Companies Registration, administered by the New Zealand Ministry of Economic Development. The Niue Legislative Assembly passed the Niue Consumption Tax Act in the first week of February 2009, and the 12.5% tax on goods and services was expected to take effect on 1 April 2009. Income tax has been lowered, and import tax may be reset to zero except for "sin" items like tobacco, alcohol and soft drinks. Tax on secondary income has been lowered from 35% to 10%, with the stated goal of fostering increased labour productivity.

Internet

In 1997, the Internet Assigned Numbers Authority (IANA), under contract with the US Department of Commerce, assigned the Internet Users Society-Niue (IUS-N), a private nonprofit, as manager of the .nu top-level domain on the Internet. IUS-N's charitable purpose was – and continues to be – to use revenue from the registration of .nu domain names to fund low-cost or free Internet services for the people of Niue. In a letter to ICANN in 2007, IUS-N's independent auditors reported IUS-N had invested US$3 million for Internet services in Niue between 1999 and 2005 from .nu domain name registration revenue during that period. In 1999, IUS-N and the Government of Niue signed an agreement whereby the Government recognised that IUS-N managed the .nu ccTLD under IANA's authority and IUS-N committed to provide free Internet services to government departments as well as to Niue's private citizens. A newly elected government later disputed that agreement and attempted to assert a claim on the domain name, including a requirement for IUS-N to make direct payments of compensation to the government. In 2005, a Government-appointed Commission of Inquiry into the dispute released its report, which found no merit in the government's claims; the government subsequently dismissed the claims in 2007. Starting in 2003, IUS-N began installing Wi-Fi connections throughout the capital village of Alofi and in several nearby villages and schools, and has been expanding Wi-Fi coverage into the outer villages since then, making Niue the first Wi-Fi nation. To assure security for government departments, IUS-N provides the government with a secure DSL connection to IUS-N's satellite Internet link, at no cost.

On Dec 16, 2020, the Government of Niue commenced an action to "redelegate" its national webspace, .nu, from the Internet Corporation for Assigned Names and Numbers (ICANN), the supranational non-profit that coordinates top-level domains to ensure the stable operation of the internet, in order to assign control of the .nu domain to the Government of Niue.

Agriculture
Agriculture is very important to the lifestyle of Niueans and the economy, and around 204 square kilometres of the land area are available for agriculture. Subsistence agriculture is very much part of Niue's culture, where nearly all the households have plantations of taro. Taro is a staple food, and the pink taro now dominant in the taro markets in New Zealand and Australia is a product of Niue. This is one of the naturally occurring taro varieties on Niue, and has a strong resistance to pests. The Niue taro is known in Samoa as "talo Niue" and in international markets as pink taro. Niue exports taro to New Zealand.
Tapioca or cassava, yams and kumara also grow very well, as do different varieties of bananas. Coconut meat, passionfruit and limes dominated exports in the 1970s, but in 2008 vanilla, noni and taro were the main export crops.

Most families grow their own food crops for subsistence and sell their surplus at the Niue Makete in Alofi, or export to New Zealand. Coconut crab, or uga, is also part of the food chain; it lives in the forest and coastal areas.

In 2003, the government made a commitment to develop and expand vanilla production with the support of NZAID. Vanilla has grown wild on Niue for a long time. The industry was devastated by Cyclone Heta in early 2004, but has since recovered.

The last agricultural census was in 1989.

Tourism

Tourism is one of the three priority economic sectors (the other two are fisheries and agriculture) for economic development. In 2006, estimated visitor expenditure reached  (equivalent to about $M in ) making tourism a major industry for Niue. Niue will continue to receive direct support from the government and overseas donor agencies. The only airport is Niue International Airport. Air New Zealand is the sole airline, flying twice a week from Auckland. In the early 1990s Niue International Airport was served by a local airline, Niue Airlines, but it closed in 1992.

There is a tourism development strategy to increase the number of rooms available to tourists at a sustainable level. Niue is trying to attract foreign investors to invest in the tourism industry by offering import and company tax concessions as incentives. New Zealand businessman Earl Hagaman, founder of Scenic Hotel Group, was awarded a contract in 2014 to manage the Matavai Resort in Niue after he made a $101,000 political donation to the New Zealand National Party, which at that time led a minority government in New Zealand. The resort is subsidized by New Zealand, which wants to bolster tourism there. In 2015 New Zealand announced $7.5m in additional funding for expansion of the resort. The selection of the Matavai contractor was made by the Niue Tourism Property Trust, whose trustees are appointed by New Zealand Foreign Affairs minister Murray McCully. Prime Minister John Key said he did not handle campaign donations, and that Niue premier Toke Talagi has long pursued tourism as a growth strategy. McCully denied any link between the donation, the foreign aid and the contractor selection.

Astronomy and star-gazing
Niue became the world's first dark sky country in March 2020. The entire island maintains standards of light development and keeps light pollution limited. Visitors will be able to enjoy guided Astro-tours led by trained Niuean community members. Viewing sites which are used for whale-watching and accessing the sea, as well as the roads that cross the island, make ideal viewing locations.

Sailing
The sailing season begins in May. Alofi Bay has many mooring buoys and yacht crews can lodge at Niue Backpackers. The anchorage in Niue is one of the least protected in the South Pacific. Other challenges of the anchorage are a primarily coral bottom and many deep spots. Mooring buoys are attached to seine floats that support the mooring lines away from seabed obstructions.

Debt
On 27 October 2016, Niue officially declared that all its national debt was paid off. The government plans to spend money saved from servicing loans on increasing pensions and offering incentives to lure expatriates back home. However, Niue is not entirely independent. New Zealand pays $14 million in aid each year and Niue still depends on New Zealand economically. Premier Toke Talagi said Niue managed to pay off US$4 million of debt and had "no interest" in borrowing again, particularly from huge powers such as China.

Information technology

The first computers were Apple machines brought in by the University of the South Pacific Extension Centre around the early 1980s. The Treasury Department computerised its general ledger in 1986 using NEC personal computers that were IBM PC XT compatible.  The Census of Households and Population in 1986 was the first to be processed using a personal computer with the assistance of David Marshall, FAO Adviser on Agricultural Statistics, advising UNFPA Demographer Dr Lawrence Lewis and Niue Government Statistician Bill Vakaafi Motufoou to switch from using manual tabulation cards. In 1987 Statistics Niue got its new personal computer NEC PC AT use for processing the 1986 census data; personnel were sent on training in Japan and New Zealand to use the new computer. The first Computer Policy was developed and adopted in 1988.

In 2003, Niue became the first country in the world to provide state-funded wireless internet to all inhabitants.

In August 2008 it has been reported that all school students have what is known as the OLPC XO-1, a specialised laptop by the One Laptop per Child project designed for children in the developing world. Niue was also a location of tests for the OpenBTS project, which aims to deliver low-cost GSM base stations built with open source software.
In July 2011, Telecom Niue launched pre-paid mobile services (Voice/EDGE – 2.5G) as Rokcell Mobile based on the commercial GSM product of vendor Lemko. Three BTS sites will cover the nation. International roaming is not currently available. The fibre optic cable ring is now completed around the island (FTTC), Internet/ADSL services were rolled out towards the end of 2011.

In January 2015 Telecom Niue completed the laying of the fibre optic cable around Niue connecting all the 14 villages, making land line phones and ADSL internet connection available to households.

Niue was connected to the Manatua Fibre Cable in 2021.

Demographics
The following demographic statistics are from the CIA World Factbook.

Population

Population growth rate
−0.03%

Nationality
Niuean(s) (noun)
Niuean (adjective)

Ethnic groups
Niuean 65.4%
Part-Niuean 14%
Non-Niuean 20.6% (includes 12% European and Asian and 8% Pacific Islanders)

Religions
Ekalesia Niue (Congregational Christian Church of Niue – a Protestant church founded by missionaries from the London Missionary Society) 61.7%
Church of Jesus Christ of Latter-day Saints 8.7%
Catholic 8.4%
Jehovah's Witnesses 2.7%
Seventh-day Adventist 1.4%
Other 8.2%
None 8.9%

Languages
Niuean (official) 46% (a Polynesian language closely related to Tongan and Samoan)
Niuean and English 32%
English (official) 11%
Niuean and others 5%, 
Other 6%

Culture

Niue is the birthplace of New Zealand artist and writer John Pule. Author of The Shark That Ate the Sun, he also paints tapa cloth inspired designs on canvas. In 2005, he co-wrote Hiapo: Past and Present in Niuean Barkcloth, a study of a traditional Niuean artform, with Australian writer and anthropologist Nicholas Thomas. Matafetu Smith founded the first Niuean women's weaving group in Auckland.

Taoga Niue is a new Government Department responsible for the preservation of culture, tradition and heritage. Recognising its importance, the Government has added Taoga Niue as the sixth pillar of the Niue Integrated Strategic Plan (NISP).

Media
Niue has two broadcast outlets, Television Niue and Radio Sunshine, managed and operated by the Broadcasting Corporation of Niue, and one newspaper, the Niue Star.

Museums 
In 2004 Cyclone Heta destroyed the Huanaki Cultural Centre & Museum. The damage resulted in the destruction of the buildings, but also the loss of over 90% of the museum's collections. In 2018 Fale Tau Tāoga Museum opened, a new national museum for Niue.

Cuisine
Due to the island location and the fact that the Niue produce a significant array of fruits and vegetables, natural local produce, especially coconut, features in many of the dishes of the islands as does fresh seafood.

Sport

Despite being a small country, a number of sports are popular. Rugby union is the most popular sport, played by both men and women; Niue was the 2008 FORU Oceania Cup champions. Netball is played only by women. There is a nine-hole golf course at Fonuakula and a single lawn bowling green. Association Football is a popular sport, as evidenced by the Niue Soccer Tournament, though the Niue national football team has played only two matches. Rugby league is also a popular sport. Niue Rugby League have only started making strides within the international arena since their first ever test match against Vanuatu, going down 22–20 in 2013. On 4 October 2014, the Niue rugby league team record their first ever international test match win defeating the Philippines 36–22. In May 2015, Niue Rugby League recorded their second international test match win against the South African Rugby League side, 48–4. Niue now sit 31st in the Rugby League World Rankings.

See also

Outline of Niue
Bibliography of Niue
Dark-sky movement

Notes

References

Further reading
Niue, the Pacific island struggling to cope as its population plummets
 Chapman, Terry M. (1976) – The Decolonisation of Niue. 
Hekau, Maihetoe & al., Niue: A History of the Island, Suva: Institute of Pacific Studies (USP) & the government of Niue, 1982 [no ISBN]
 Loeb, Edwin M. (1926) – History and Traditions of Niue. 
 Painter, Margaret and Kalaisi Folau (2000) – Tagi Tote e Loto Haaku, My Heart Is Crying a Little: Niue Island Involvement in the Great War, 1914–1918. 
 Smith, Percy – Niue-fekai (or Savage) Island and its People. 
 Sperlich, Wolfgang B. (2012) – Tohi Vagahau Niue/Niue Language Dictionary: Niuean-English, with English-Niuean Finderlist. 
 Thomson, Basil C. (2012) – Savage Island: An Account of a Sojourn in Niue and Tonga. 
 James P Terry and Warwick E Murray (edited by) - Niue Island: Geographical Perspectives on the Rock of Polynesia International Scientific Council for Island Development (INSULA), UNESCO, .
 SPREP, Rod Hay and Ralph Powlesland, Compiled by Joanna Sim –Guide to Birds of Niue
Tregear, Edward, "Niue: or Savage Island", The Journal of the Polynesian Society, vol.2, March 1893, pp. 11–16
 W R Sykes – Contributions to the Flora of Niue
 Dick Scott (1993) – Would a Good Man Die

External links

 Government
Niuean Government official site
 General information
Niue. The World Factbook. Central Intelligence Agency.
Niue from UCB Libraries GovPubs

 Travel
Niue Tourism Office

 
1974 establishments in Oceania
Associated states of New Zealand
British Western Pacific Territories
Countries in Polynesia
English-speaking countries and territories
Former British colonies and protectorates in Oceania
Island countries
New Zealand–Pacific relations
Populated places established in the 10th century
Small Island Developing States
States and territories established in 1974
Countries in Oceania
Important Bird Areas of Niue